Saibal Chatterjee is an Indian film critic, an author of a book on Gulzar, co-editor of a book on films; and a documentary scriptwriter. He was a columnist at BBC News, Business Standard, Hindustan Times and Financial Express. And a staff writer of The Telegraph, The Times of India, and Outlook; the editor of TV World; and a consultant to Zee Premiere. He presently reviews films for NDTV. He's a founder member of the Film Critics Circle of India (FCCI). He was a key member of the editorial board of Encyclopædia Britannica's Encyclopaedia of Hindi Cinema. He has served on the team as well as jury of a variety of international film festivals. And is the festival director of the upcoming Pondicherry International Film Festival.

Books
Author - Echoes & Eloquences: The Life And Cinema Of Gulzar
Co-author - Hollywood Bollywood: The Politics of Crossover Films
Editor - Encyclopaedia of Hindi Cinema

Awards
2003 - National Film Award - Best Film Critic at the 51st National Film Awards

Member of the jury
Aurangabad International Film Festival
South Asian Short Film Festival
Indian Film Institute
IFFI Panorama
Smile Foundation's Smile International Film Festival for Children and Youth

References

External links
 Saibal Chatterjee at Film Critics Circle of India

Living people
Year of birth missing (living people)
Place of birth missing (living people)
Nationality missing
Indian film critics
Best Critic National Film Award winners